Dark wave (also typeset as darkwave) is a music genre that emerged from the new wave and post-punk movement of the late 1970s. Dark wave compositions are largely based on minor key tonality and introspective lyrics and have been perceived as being dark, romantic and bleak, with an undertone of sorrow. The genre embraces a range of styles including cold wave, ethereal wave, gothic rock, neoclassical dark wave and neofolk.

In the 1980s, a subculture developed primarily in Europe alongside dark wave music, whose followers were called wavers or dark wavers. In some countries such as Germany, the movement also included fans of gothic rock (so-called trad-goths).

1980s: Origins 

Since the 1980s, the term has been used in Europe to describe the gloomy and melancholy variant of new wave and post-punk music. At that time, the term "goth" was inseparably connected with gothic rock, whereas "dark wave" acquired a broader meaning, including music artists that were associated with gothic rock and synthesizer-based new wave music.

The movement spread internationally, developing such strands as ethereal wave, with bands such as Cocteau Twins, and neoclassical dark wave, initiated by the music of Dead Can Dance and In the Nursery. Simultaneously, different substyles associated with the new wave and dark wave movements started to merge and influence each other.

German dark wave bands were partially associated with the Neue Deutsche Welle (i.e. German new wave).  Other bands, such as Malaria! and the Vyllies, added elements of chanson and cabaret music, which became known as cabaret noir (or "dark cabaret", a term popularized by U.S. dark wave label Projekt Records).

1990s: Second generation 

After the new wave and post-punk movements faded in the mid-1980s, dark wave was renewed as an underground movement. Ataraxia and The Frozen Autumn from Italy, and the French Corpus Delicti also evolved from this movement and became the leading artists of the west Romanesque scene. These bands followed a path based on the new wave and post-punk music of the 1980s.

At the same time, a number of German artists developed a more theatrical style, interspersed with German poetic, metaphorical lyrics, called Neue Deutsche Todeskunst (literally New German Death Art). Other bands combined synthesizers with elements of neofolk and neoclassical dark wave.

After 1993, in the United States the term dark wave (as the one-word variant 'darkwave') became associated with the Projekt Records label, because it was adopted by label founder Sam Rosenthal after leafing through the pages of German music magazines such as Zillo, and has been used to promote and market artists from German label Hyperium Records in the U.S. (e.g. Chandeen and Love Is Colder Than Death).

Projekt featured bands such as Lycia, Black Tape for a Blue Girl, and Love Spirals Downwards, some of these characterized by atmospheric guitar and synth-sounds and female vocals. This style took cues from 1980s bands like Cocteau Twins and is often referred to as ethereal dark wave. Projekt has also had a long association with Attrition, who appeared on the label's earliest compilations. Joshua Gunn, a professor of communication studies at Louisiana University, described the U.S. type of dark wave music as

2010s: Revival 

In the 2010s, a new generation of bands has rekindled the darkwave genre for a new generation of fans. The most prominent of these acts is Boy Harsher, but others include Drab Majesty, Pixel Grip, and Kontravoid. Substance is annual Darkwave and Industrial music festival occurring in Los Angeles which began in the 2010s.

See also
 Ambient music
 Dungeon synth

References

External links
 

 
New wave music
Dark music genres
Fusion music genres
Goth subculture
Music scenes
British styles of music
British rock music genres